is a Japanese international school in Frankfurt - Hausen, Germany.

The Japanisches Institut Frankfurt am Main e.V. (フランクフルト補習授業校 Furankufuruto Hoshū Jugyō Kō), a Japanese weekend supplementary school, conducts its classes in the same building.

It was first established on April 21, 1985 (Showa 60). As of FY2022, a total of 207 students were enrolled at JISF, with 34 staffs working at the school. Of the students, 164 were in grades 1 to 6 while 43 were in 7 to 9.

See also

 Japanese people in Germany
German international schools in Japan:
German School Tokyo Yokohama - in Yokohama, Japan
Deutsche Schule Kobe/European School

References

Further reading
 Yamaguchi, Akio (山口 昭男 Yamaguchi Akio) (前フランクフルト日本人国際学校教; 諭・兵庫県神戸市立宮本小学校教諭). "フランクフルト日本人国際学校での国際交流学習の展開 : 異なったものを認めよう." 在外教育施設における指導実践記録 22, 75–78, 1999. Tokyo Gakugei University. See profile at CiNii.

External links
 Japanische Internationale Schule Frankfurt
 Japanische Internationale Schule Frankfurt Livedoor URL
 Japanische Internationale Schule Frankfurt (Archive at schoolweb.ne.jp)
 Japanische Internationale Schule Frankfurt (Archive of jis-ffm.de)
 Japanische Internationale Schule Frankfurt (Archive of kddnet.de/jis-ffm/)
  "Japanische Internationale Schule Frankfurt." City of Frankfurt.

Frankfurt
International schools in Hesse
Schools in Frankfurt
1985 establishments in West Germany
Educational institutions established in 1985